Gongnong Subdistrict is a subdistrict in Ningjiang District, Songyuan, Jilin province, China. , it has 2 residential communities under its administration.

See also 
 List of township-level divisions of Jilin

References 

Township-level divisions of Jilin
Songyuan